Reynell may refer to:

Electoral district of Reynell, electoral district of the House of Assembly in the Australian state of South Australia
Reynell Coates (1802–1886), American physician, scientist, teacher, and poet
Reynell Cotton (1717–1779), President of the Hambledon Club in 1773 and 1774

See also
Reynell (surname), early form of the Reynolds surname
Reynell Baronets